Le Parc de Saint-Maur is a French railway station in Saint-Maur-des-Fossés, in Val-de-Marne département.

The station 
The RER station opened in 1969 and is named after a district of Saint-Maur.

It is served by RER A trains running on branch A2, ending in Boissy-Saint-Léger.

History 
The station was opened around 1859 as Vincennes railway (Paris Bastille - Marles-en-Brie) was being put into service. Then, it was transformed in a RER station.

Service 
Le Parc de Saint-Maur is served in both directions by a train every 10 minutes at off-peak time, by 12 trains an hour during peak hours, and by a train every 15 minutes during the evening.

Bus connections 

See also 
 List of stations of the Paris RER

References

Réseau Express Régional stations
Railway stations in Val-de-Marne
Railway stations in France opened in 1969